Néicer Reasco Yano (born 23 July 1977) is an Ecuadorian retired footballer who played as a defender.

Club career
Reasco began his professional club career playing for L.D.U. Quito for seven years. After the 2006 World Cup, he joined São Paulo in Brazil for a two-year contract, the only non-Brazilian on the team. In mid-2008, he rejoined his first club.

International career
He was part of the Ecuador national team that competed at the 2006 FIFA World Cup in Germany. He was named to Ecuador's squad for the 2007 and 2011 Copa América.

Personal life
Reasco is the father of Ecuador forward Djorkaeff Reasco, who made his debut for LDU Quito in November 2016 in a game Reasco Sr. also played in.

Honors
L.D.U. Quito
Serie A (5): 1998, 1999, 2003, 2005 Apertura, 2010
Serie B (1): 2001
Copa Sudamericana (1): 2009
Recopa Sudamericana (2): 2009, 2010

São Paulo
Campeonato Brasileiro Série A (3): 2006, 2007, 2008

References

External links
Reasco's FEF player card 
Brazilian FA Database 
globoesporte 
La Nacion 

1977 births
Living people
People from San Lorenzo, Ecuador
Association football fullbacks
Ecuadorian footballers
Ecuador international footballers
2004 Copa América players
2006 FIFA World Cup players
2007 Copa América players
2011 Copa América players
L.D.U. Quito footballers
Newell's Old Boys footballers
São Paulo FC players
S.D. Aucas footballers
Ecuadorian Serie A players
Argentine Primera División players
Campeonato Brasileiro Série A players
Ecuadorian expatriate footballers
Ecuadorian expatriate sportspeople in Brazil
Ecuadorian expatriate sportspeople in Argentina
Expatriate footballers in Argentina
Expatriate footballers in Brazil